Piper's Ash is a small hamlet between the areas of Vicars Cross, Christleton, and Guilden Sutton, situated in west Cheshire. Piper's Ash is classed as semi-rural because it is situated approximately 200 yards from the A51 on one side and countryside on the other. Village amenities include (or included) a corner shop, a chapel, (both now converted into houses) and a small village green with a phone and postbox.

Villages in Cheshire